Line 2 of the Xiamen Metro is a subway line in Xiamen. It was opened on December 25, 2019.

Opening timeline

Stations

Construction mishap 
In mid-December 2019, construction works near the Siming District were affected by subsidence. A major water pipe burst, and dirty water flooded the construction site, affecting the concourse, platform and metro lines under construction. The cause is believed to be a burst water pipe. Water also penetrated the now-opened Lücuo station of Line 1, and flooded the concourse and platform.

References

02
Railway lines opened in 2019
2019 establishments in China